Muncelu may refer to several places in Romania:

Populated places
 Muncelu, a village in the town of Baia de Arieș, Alba County
 Muncelu, a village in Glăvănești Commune, Bacău County
 Muncelu, a village in Ion Creangă Commune, Neamţ County
 Muncelu, a village in Străoane Commune, Vrancea County
 Muncelu de Jos, a village in Valea Ursului Commune, Neamţ County
 Muncelu de Sus, a village in Mogoșești-Siret Commune, Iași County

Rivers
 Muncel, a tributary of the Crivaia in Hunedoara County
 Muncelu, another name for the Latorița de Mijloc River in Vâlcea County
 Muncelu, a tributary of the Pogoana in Sibiu County
 Muncelu, a tributary of the Suha in Suceava County

See also 
 Muncel (disambiguation)